Rui Gomes de Abreu (c.1460–1530?) was a Portuguese nobleman, who served as Alcaide Mayor of Elvas.

Biography 

Rui was the son of Pedro Gomes de Abreu and Catarina de Eça, a noble lady, who was Abbess of the Convent of Lorvão. She was the daughter of Infante Fernando, Lord of Eça and Leonor de Teive. 

Rui Gomes de Abreu was married to Inês Brandão, daughter of Fernão Brandão Sanches, comendador of Afife and Cabanas, and Catarina Fagundes, belonging to noble Portuguese Galician family.

References 

1460 births
1530s deaths
15th-century Portuguese people
16th-century Portuguese people
Portuguese nobility
Portuguese Roman Catholics